Eric Darnell (born August 21, 1961) is an American animator, storyboard artist, director, screenwriter, songwriter and occasional voice actor best known for co-directing Antz with Tim Johnson, as well as co-directing and co-writing Madagascar, Madagascar: Escape 2 Africa and Madagascar 3: Europe's Most Wanted with Tom McGrath, as well as the spin off Penguins of Madagascar (2014) with Simon J. Smith.

Life and career
Darnell was born in Prairie Village, Kansas. He attended Shawnee Mission East High School in Prairie Village, Kansas, where he was a writer for the school newspaper the Harbinger. He studied broadcast journalism at the University of Colorado at Boulder. After graduating in 1983, he spent four years working on experimental films in his basement, which helped him get accepted into the Experimental Animation program study at the California Institute of the Arts. Meanwhile, he directed the music video for the 1989 R.E.M. song "Get Up".

After graduating in 1991, Darnell joined Pacific Data Images, where he worked as a character animator on the 1991 Hanna-Barbera Halloween special The Last Halloween. He also animated and directed the short film Gas Planet, which won the Ottawa International Animation Festival Special Jury Prize. In 1995, he left PDI to join DreamWorks Animation, where he helped with research and development for The Prince of Egypt. Shortly after DreamWorks merged with PDI the following year, he was assigned to direct his first feature film, Antz, co-directing alongside fellow PDI-turned-DreamWorks employee Tim Johnson. The film, released in 1998, marked the studio's first computer-animated feature film, and the second computer-animated feature film after Pixar's Toy Story. He then worked as a storyboard artist on the 2001 film Shrek, for which he also wrote the song "Welcome to Duloc."

Darnell and Tom McGrath directed Madagascar in 2005 and its sequel, Madagascar: Escape 2 Africa in 2008. He was co-writer for the Christmas TV special, Merry Madagascar. Darnell also co-directed Madagascar 3: Europe's Most Wanted with McGrath and Conrad Vernon, which was released on June 8, 2012. He co-directed, with Simon J. Smith, a Madagascar spin-off, titled Penguins of Madagascar and released on November 26, 2014.

In 2015, Darnell co-founded with Maureen Fan, a former vice president of games at Zynga, a Redwood City, California-based virtual reality studio Baobab Studios to create animated virtual reality short films. Darnell serves as Baobab's chief creative officer, while Fan serves as its CEO. For the studio, Darnell wrote and directed short VR films, Invasion! (2016) and its follow-up Asteroids! (2017), featuring two comedic aliens, Mac and Cheeze. Plans for a feature-length film based on the characters were announced in 2016 by Baobab and Roth Kirschenbaum Films. Darnell also wrote and directed an animated VR short film, Crow: The Legend, inspired by the Lenape myth. Released in 2018, it features the voices of John Legend, Constance Wu, Oprah Winfrey, Diego Luna and Liza Koshy.

Personal life
Darnell lives in Campbell, California with his wife, Laura, and their son, Rex, and daughter, Leah.

Filmography

Feature films

Short films

Television series

References

External links
 

1961 births
Animators from Kansas
American animated film directors
American animated film producers
American storyboard artists
California Institute of the Arts alumni
University of Colorado Boulder alumni
Living people
Showrunners
People from Prairie Village, Kansas
Princess Grace Awards winners
DreamWorks Animation people
Nickelodeon Animation Studio people
People from Campbell, California
Film directors from California
Film directors from Kansas